The Central Uplands is one of the three major natural regions of Germany. It stretches east to west across the country. To the north lies the North German Plain or Northern Lowland; to the south, the Alps and the Alpine Foreland.

Formation 
The German Central Uplands, like the Scandinavian and British mountain ranges and the Urals, belong to the oldest mountains of Europe, even if their present-day appearance has only developed relatively recently. In the Carboniferous, i.e. about 350 million years ago, Variscan mountain ranges were formed in central Europe by the uplifting caused by tectonic plate collision. Immediately after their formation the erosion of the mountains began under the influence of exogenous processes  during the Permian period.
During the Triassic period, which began about 225 million years ago, what is now central Europe was sometimes above and sometimes below sea level. As a result, there are various layers of sedimentary rock in the Central Uplands: in most cases new red sandstone has been laid down as the terrestrial layer of rock and keuper and muschelkalk as marine sedimentary layers. The Jurassic period primarily saw the formation of limestone, whilst chalk was the main deposition from the Cretaceous period.

With the beginning of the Cenozoic era, some 70 million years ago, the process of erosion of the Hercynian mountain ranges changed. During the Tertiary, alpidic mountain building took place, in the course of which strong forces deformed the stumps of the Hercynian mountains. As these rocks were already folded, further tension led to cracks and fractures, which in turn created fault blocks. These blocks were later uplifted (forming horsts such as the Harz), or downfaulted (trough faults or graben such as the Upper Rhine Valley) or thrust over one another (tilted fault blocks such as the Ore Mountains). Thus the German Central Uplands exhibit the widest variety of forms, something that is also attributable to the erosion of sediments from the Mesozoic (Triassic, Jurassic and Cretaceous). In some ranges the sediments have been relatively well-preserved, in others they have been carried away completely. The determining factor is the local intensity of exogenous processes.

Most important ranges 
The table lists the ranges peaking over 300 m above sea level widely seen as part of the Central Uplands. The coordinates are of the respective peaks. Many of the uplands overlap. The ranges are listed by height.

See also 

 Geography of Germany
 Mittelgebirge, generic German term for low mountain or high hill ranges
 Natural regions of Germany

References

Sources 
 Dickinson, Robert E (1964). Germany: A regional and economic geography (2nd ed.). London: Methuen. .

External links 

 
Natural regions of Germany
Highlands

de:Mittelgebirge#Die deutschen Mittelgebirge